Talorgan son of Eanfrith (died 657) was a King of the Picts from 653 to 657. As with his successors Gartnait son of Donuel and Drest son of Donuel, he reigned as a puppet king under the Northumbrian king Oswiu.

Talorgan was the son of Eanfrith of Bernicia, who had fled into exile among the Picts after his father, the Bernician king Æthelfrith, was killed around the year 616. Talorgan's mother is likely to have been a member of a powerful Pictish royal dynasty, and he may have claimed Pictish kingship through her, but his rule may also have been due to the fact that he was the nephew of Oswiu at a time Oswiu was ruling Northumbria, and was reported by Bede to have subdued "the greater part of the Pictish race".

Talorgan became king in 653, probably with a powerbase within the southern Pictish territory south of the Mounth, which was also probably the home territory of his predecessor Talorc son of Uuid. In the next year, he defeated and killed Dúnchad mac Conaing, king of the Dál Riata, in battle at Strath Ethairt. This may have been part of a traditional "inaugural raid" against hostile neighbours to mark the beginning of a king's rule.

References

Bibliography
 
 

657 deaths
Pictish monarchs
7th-century Scottish monarchs
Year of birth unknown
Royal House of Northumbria